The International Conference on Applied Human Factors and Ergonomics (AHFE) is an academic multi-conference that includes several affiliated conferences, jointly held under one management and one registration. The conference provides an international forum for the exchange of scientific information on theoretical, generic, and applied areas of ergonomics, including physical ergonomics, cognitive and neuroergonomics, social and occupational ergonomics, affective and pleasurable design, and systems engineering. The conference includes keynote presentations, parallel sessions, poster sessions, tutorials, exhibits, and special interest meetings. Submissions are peer-reviewed and published in the conference proceedings; select papers are also expanded and published in AHFE Edited Conference Books.

Affiliated Conferences
The number of conferences affiliated with AHFE has grown since its inception. For 2016, the AHFE affiliated conferences include:

 International Conference on Design for Inclusion
 international Symposium on Cognitive Computing
 International Conference on Human Factors in Management and Leadership
 International Conference on Human Factors in Cybersecurity
 International Conference on Human Factors and Systems Interaction
 International Conference on Human Factors in Robots and Unmanned Systems
 International Conference on Human Factors in Sports and Outdoor Recreation
 International Conference on Human Factors in Energy: Oil, Gas, Nuclear and Electric Power Industries
 International Conference on Human Factors, Business Management and Society
 International Symposium on Human Factors in Training, Education, and Learning Sciences
 International IBM Symposium on Human Factors, Software, and Systems Engineering
 International Conference on Safety Management and Human Factors
 International Conference on Human Factors and Sustainable Infrastructure 
 International Conference on The Human Side of Service Engineering
 International Conference on Affective and Pleasurable Design
 International Conference on Human Factors in Transportation
 International Conference on Ergonomics In Design
 International Conference on Human Factors and Ergonomics in Healthcare
 International Conference on Cross-Cultural Decision Making
 International Conference on Applied Digital Human Modeling and Simulation
 International Conference on The Human Aspects of Advanced Manufacturing (HAAMAHA): Managing Enterprise of the Future

History
The AHFE international conference was founded by Gavriel Salvendy, who continues to serve as its overall Scientific Advisor. Originally, the conference was named the International Conference on Applied Ergonomics, and the First International Conference on Applied Ergonomics (ICAE '96) was held in 1996. The second conference was not held until 12 years later, and it was renamed under its current moniker. Conference organizers also launched the Applied Human Factors and Ergonomics International NEWS newsletter at that time, which they continue to publish semi-regularly.

After the second conference, AHFE was held every-other year. At the 2014 conference, organizers announced that they would begin holding it annually.

Current conference leadership includes Waldemar Karwowski (University of Central Florida), who serves as the General Conference Chair, and Dylan Schmorrow (Soar Technology), appointed as the Scientific and Technical Advisor in 2014.

Past AHFE conferences
Past and future AHFE conferences include:

References

External links
 AHFE 2016 conference site
 AHFE 2015 conference site
 AHFE Facebook Fan Page

Ergonomics